Narcissus albimarginatus is a species of the genus Narcissus (daffodils) in the family Amaryllidaceae. It is classified in Section Apodanthi , and is endemic to Morocco.

References 

albimarginatus
Garden plants
Flora of Morocco